The 2012–13 Real Betis season was the club's 78th season in its history.

Review and events

Competitions

Legend

La Liga

League table

Matches

Copa del Rey

Round of 32

Round of 16

Squad

Squad, matches played and goals scored

Minutes played

Starting 11

Bookings

Squad

Squad, matches played and goals scored

Minutes played

Starting 11

Bookings

Transfers

In

Out

Sources

Real Betis
Real Betis seasons